Mohammad Sharif Khan (Born in 1926, Poonch, British India – Died 26 May 1980, Pakistan) known as Ustad Sharif Khan
Poonchwaley was a classical player of sitar, vichitra veena and raza been (rudra veena) in the hindustani classical music tradition.

Career
Sharif Khan was born at Hisar, now in Haryana, India in a family of musicians.
He learned sitar from his father Ustad Rahim Bakhsh Khan, who himself was a student of Ustad Imdad Khan. His father, in fact, was a court musician of the Raja of Poonch. Sharif Khan Poonchwaley learned vichitra veena from Ustad Abdul Aziz Khan Beenkar.
 
Ustad Sharif Khan Poonchwaley‚ belongs to Etawah gharana (Imdadkhani gharana) (traditional school) of sitar.  He performed as a young sitar player at the YMCA Hall in Lahore in 1942. Some renowned luminaries of music also performed there with him including Bade Ghulam Ali Khan of Kasur, Ustad Fayyaz Khan of Baroda and Ustad Amir Khan of Indore. All of these musicians were invited to participate in the 2-day music festival at Lahore in 1942. He played a key role in promoting the sitar in Pakistan.

He was a member of the early original team hired by the first Managing Director Aslam Azhar of Pakistan Television, Lahore Center to perform as a sitar player, when it first started TV broadcasts in 1964. Everywhere he went, he charmed audiences with his stylishness, registering the intricacies and subtleties of otherwise typical ragas. He also played the sitar for some of the film compositions of Pakistan's noted film music director Khwaja Khurshid Anwar.

Awards and recognition
Sharif Khan was awarded the Pride of Performance Award in 1965 for his services to Pakistan.

Legacy
In 2011, his son Ashraf Sharif Khan gives sitar performances at music festivals in Pakistan.

References

External links
 Sharif Khan Poonchwaley's performance on YouTube

Hindustani instrumentalists
Etawah gharana
Sitar players
Vichitra veena players
Rudra veena players
Pakistani musicians
1926 births
1980 deaths
Recipients of the Pride of Performance